The narrowmouthed catshark (Schroederichthys bivius) is a catshark of the family Scyliorhinidae, found from central Chile around the Straits of Magellan, to Argentina between latitudes 23° S and 56° S, at depths down to about  in the Atlantic Ocean and about  in the Pacific. The reproduction of this catshark is oviparous.

Description
As a juvenile, the narrowmouthed catshark is elongated and very slender, but as it grows its proportions change and it becomes rather more thickset. Its adult length can reach  or more. The snout is rounded and slender and the front nasal flaps are narrow and lobed. This fish displays heterodont dentition; the mouth is long in both sexes, but is longer and narrower in males, with teeth that are twice the height of those of females. The general colour of the dorsal surface of both sexes is greyish-brown, with seven or eight dark brown saddles. Some large dark spots are scattered along the body but do not occur on the saddles. There are also many small white spots on the upper half of the body.

Distribution
The narrowmouthed catshark is endemic to the coasts of South America, between latitudes 23° S and 56° S. In the southwestern Atlantic Ocean its range extends from southern Brazil, southwards to the Beagle Channel and in the southeasterly Pacific Ocean, southwards from northern Chile.

Ecology
The narrowmouthed catshark is a demersal fish, feeding mostly on crustaceans and some fish. In the Beagle Channel in the summer it has been found to feed almost exclusively on the squat lobster Munida gregaria, but in other places its diet is more varied. The females are oviparous, the eggs being laid in egg cases which are attached to the seabed in estuaries and sheltered waters by tendrils. The newly hatched juvenile fish use these sheltered areas as nurseries.

Status
The International Union for Conservation of Nature has assessed this species as "least concern".

References

narrowmouthed catshark
Fish of Chile
Fish of Argentina
Fauna of Temperate South America
Taxa named by Johannes Peter Müller 
Taxa named by Friedrich Gustav Jakob Henle
narrowmouthed catshark